Bethel Methodist Protestant Church, also known as Bethel Church, is a historic Methodist church and cemetery at the junction of Andrewville Road and Todds Chapel Road/Prospect Church Road in Andrewville, Kent County, Delaware. It was built in 1871, and is a one-story, three bay by four bay, gable-roofed, Gothic-influenced frame building.  It measures 30 feet, 6 inches, in width by 40 feet, 6 inches, deep.  The interior was renovated in 1905.  Adjacent to the church is the cemetery, containing only one or two gravestones.

It was added to the National Register of Historic Places in 1998.

References

Methodist churches in Delaware
Churches on the National Register of Historic Places in Delaware
Carpenter Gothic church buildings in Delaware
Churches completed in 1871
19th-century Methodist church buildings in the United States
Churches in Kent County, Delaware
National Register of Historic Places in Kent County, Delaware